The 1949 Emory and Henry Wasps football team represented Emory and Henry College during the 1949 college football season. In Conley Snidow's second season as head coach, the Wasps compiled a 11–1 record and outscored their opponents by a total of 323 to 121. Emory and Henry won two conference championships, with a 4–0 record in the Smoky Mountain Conference and a 2–0 record in the first season of competition for the Virginia Little Six Conference. The Wasps were also named Virginia Sports team of the Year by the Associated Press in December.

Schedule

Second team schedule

References

Emory and Henry
Emory and Henry Wasps football seasons
Emory and Henry Wasps football